Afragola is a city and comune in the Metropolitan City of Naples, in Italy. It is one of the 100 largest Italian cities (the ones that have a population of more than 63,000 inhabitants).

The comune of Afragola   is one of the most densely populated of the country.

History
The area of modern Afragola was already settled in ancient times by the Samnites. Older remains, belonging to an early Bronze Age settlement buried by a Vesuvius eruption in the 19th century BC, were found in 2005.

According to a tradition now recognized as false, the town was founded in the Middle Ages, in 1140, by Roger II of Sicily, who assigned the land to its veterans. It is more likely that the city stemmed from the merger of several villages and churches already existing here. The territory was originally held by the archbishops of Naples, but from 1576 it was directly subjected, as an autonomous community, to the Kings of Naples.

Main sights

Baroque sanctuary-basilica of St. Anthony's sanctuary-basilica. It was begun in 1633 and has a nave with two aisles, internally decorated  with marbles. The bell tower was constructed from 1590.
The castle, documented from 1495, was likely built from around 1420. According to the tradition, it was a residence of queen Joanna II of Naples. It currently houses a childhood school.
Santa Maria d'Ajello Church, founded in 1190. It houses works by Giovan Angelo Criscuolo, Alessandro Viola (1695) and Angelo Mozzillo.
San Marco in Sylvis Church, built around 1179. On its external wall is a slab on which, according to the legend, once sat both St. Mark and San Gennaro.
San Marco all'Olmo Church, built in 1615.
Palazzo Migliore (17th century)
San Giorgio Martire: Parish church built in 1695-1702

Transport

Napoli Afragola railway station was designed by the architect Zaha Hadid and opened in 2017. This station is only used by high-speed trains on the Rome–Naples high-speed line, which link Afragola to many Italian cities including Bologna, Milan, Florence and Turin.

Afragola's bus network is managed by CTP (the Consorzio Trasporto Pubblico or Public Transport Consortium).

The proposed Line 10 of the Naples Metro will also serve Afragola.

Criminality and social issues
Afragola is the seat of one of the largest camorra clans of the area, led by Anna Mazza. In 1999 and 2005, the communal council was disbanded by rule of the President of Italian Republic due to mafia allegiance of some of its members.

Along with most of the nearby communes, Afragola also suffers from high pollution rates, as well as a high unemployment rate; unreported employment is also widespread.

References

External links

Official website 

Cities and towns in Campania